Vincent Paul Winn (born 26 July 1966) is a former English cricketer. Winn was a right-handed batsman.

Winn made his List-A debut for Huntingdonshire in the 1999 NatWest Trophy against Bedfordshire.  Winn played 2 further List-A matches for Huntingdonshire in the 2000 NatWest Trophy against a Hampshire Cricket Board side and a Yorkshire Cricket Board side, against whom he scored his only one-day fifty.  In his 3 one-day matches, he scored 97 runs at a batting average of 32.33.

References

External links
Vincent Winn at Cricinfo
Vincent Winn at CricketArchive

1966 births
Sportspeople from Cambridge
English cricketers
Huntingdonshire cricketers
Living people